In the mathematics of coding theory, the Griesmer bound, named after James Hugo Griesmer, is a bound on the length of linear binary codes of dimension k and minimum distance d.
There is also a very similar version for non-binary codes.

Statement of the bound 
For a binary linear code, the Griesmer bound is:

Proof 

Let  denote the minimum length of a binary code of dimension k and distance d. Let C be such a code. We want to show that 

Let G be a generator matrix of C. We can always suppose that the first row of G is of the form r = (1, ..., 1, 0, ..., 0) with weight d.
 

The matrix  generates a code , which is called the residual code of   obviously has dimension  and length   has a distance  but we don't know it. Let  be such that .

so this becomes . By summing this with  we obtain . But  so we get  As  is integral, we get  This implies 

 

so that

By induction over k we will eventually get 

Note that at any step the dimension decreases by 1 and the distance is halved, and we use the identity 

 

for any integer a and positive integer k.

The bound for the general case

 

The proof is similar to the binary case and so it is omitted.

See also
Singleton bound
Hamming bound
Gilbert-Varshamov bound
Johnson bound
Plotkin bound
 Elias Bassalygo bound

References
J. H. Griesmer, "A bound for error-correcting codes," IBM Journal of Res. and Dev., vol. 4, no. 5, pp. 532-542, 1960.

Coding theory
Articles containing proofs